Dublin City Council is the authority responsible for local government in the city of Dublin in Ireland. As a city council, it is governed by the Local Government Act 2001. Until 2001, the council was known as Dublin Corporation. The council is responsible for public housing and community, roads and transportation, urban planning and development, amenity and culture and environment. The council has 63 elected members and is the largest local council in Ireland. Elections are held every five years and are by single transferable vote. The head of the council has the honorific title of Lord Mayor. The city administration is headed by a Chief Executive, Owen Keegan. The council meets at City Hall, Dublin.

Legal status
Local government in Dublin is regulated by the Local Government Act 2001. This provided for the renaming of the old Dublin Corporation to its present title of Dublin City Council. Dublin City Council sends seven representatives to the Eastern and Midland Regional Assembly, one of three such Assemblies in the state.

Dublin City is bordered by the counties of Fingal, South Dublin and Dún Laoghaire–Rathdown. These four local government areas comprise the traditional County Dublin. In 2013, all of Dublin's councils, except Fingal, supported the introduction of an executive mayor the Dublin Metropolitan Area, and a Citizen's Assembly has been planned in order to establish what a combined Dublin Mayorship would look like.

Statutory functions 
The functions of the City Council include: public housing, city library services, refuse services, drainage, driver and vehicle licensing, planning and roads. The Council budgeted to spend €847,137,522 during 2007 in service of these functions. 50.5% of this went towards the payroll of the council's staff which was a reduction from 50.7% in 2006. In the case of Traffic Management, the council receives grants from the Department of Environment, Heritage and Local Government and also the National Roads Authority to assist it in meeting this responsibility. The 2007 roads budget was just over €105,000,000, to support maintenance of all roads in its functional area.

History

Prior to 1841, the administrative and governmental system of Dublin, known as Dublin Corporation, was bicameral having an assembly of called the "House of Aldermen" and another called the "House of Sheriffs and Commons". Under the Municipal Corporations (Ireland) Act 1840, they were replaced by a unicameral assembly. The new name Dublin City Council was coined for the unicameral assembly.  The Lord Mayor of Dublin presided over the assembly. This office had existed since 1665. The first City Council was elected in October 1841 when Daniel O'Connell became the first Lord Mayor. Since 1 January 2002, the functions of local government have been transferred to Dublin City Council. To coincide with its name change, the City Council adopted a new logo and brand identity, based on a simplified version of the ancient "three castles" symbol.

Structures
Executive power is shared between the council and an appointed executive official known as the Chief Executive. The chief executive is responsible for a staff of 6,200. The offices of the chief executive and other administrative staff are based in the Civic Offices on Wood Quay. The Lord Mayor of Dublin acts as chair of the council is the ceremonial head of the city government.

Representative power is vested in the city assembly which consists of 63 members. Members are elected using proportional representation by means of the single transferable vote, every five years from Dublin City Council local electoral areas. The City Council meets in plenary session on the first Monday of every month in Dublin City Hall. One of the council's most important roles is that of passing an annual budget. Should any Irish council fail to pass a budget within the allotted time, the Minister for the Environment is empowered to abolish it and grant its powers to a commissioner until the next scheduled council elections.

Local electoral areas
Dublin City Council has 63 seats, which is divided into the following local electoral areas, defined by electoral divisions.

Current councillors

The following were elected at the 2019 Dublin City Council election, under the boundaries which existed at the time. The council has 63 seats.

2019 seats summary

Councillors by electoral area

This list reflects the order in which councillors were elected on 24 May 2019.

Notes

Co-options

Changes in affiliation

Council buildings

The Lord Mayor's official residence is the Mansion House, which first became the residence of the Lord Mayor in 1715.

Council meetings take place in the headquarters at Dublin City Hall. Formerly Royal Exchange, the City Hall is one of Dublin's finest buildings and located on Dame Street. It was built in 1769–79 to the winning design of Thomas Cooley. In an architectural competition, James Gandon was the runner-up with a scheme that many people favoured. The building was taken over for city government use in the 1850s.

References

External links

Full list of Councillors
History of Dublin City Council
Podcast about the history of local government in Dublin

City Council
City Council
City councils in the Republic of Ireland
1841 establishments in Ireland
Politics of Dublin (city)